Friends of Mr. Sweeney is a 1934 American comedy film directed by Edward Ludwig and written by Warren B. Duff, Sid Sutherland, F. Hugh Herbert and Erwin S. Gelsey. It is based on the 1925 novel Friends of Mr. Sweeney by Elmer Davis. The film stars Charlie Ruggles, Ann Dvorak, Eugene Pallette, Robert Barrat, Berton Churchill and Dorothy Burgess. The film was released by Warner Bros. on July 28, 1934.

Plot

Cast        
Charlie Ruggles as Asaph 'Ace' Holliday 
Ann Dvorak as Miss Beulah Boyd
Eugene Pallette as Wynn Rixey
Robert Barrat as Alexis Romanoff
Berton Churchill as Franklyn P. Brumbaugh
Dorothy Burgess as Millie Seagrove
Dorothy Tree as Countess Olga Andrei Misitalsky
Harry Tyler as Mike
Harry Beresford as Claude
William B. Davidson as Stephen Prime

References

External links
 

1934 films
1930s English-language films
American comedy films
1934 comedy films
Warner Bros. films
Films directed by Edward Ludwig
American black-and-white films
1930s American films